Matthew Lloyd is a former Australian rules footballer for Essendon.

Matthew Lloyd may also refer to:

Matthew Lloyd (cyclist) (born 1983), Australian professional road bicycle racer
Matt Lloyd (footballer) (born 1965), Australian rules footballer for the Sydney Swans
Matt Lloyd (Paralympian) (born 1972), British ice sledge hockey paralympian